Nikita Olegovich Kolotiyevsky (born 4 March 2001) is a Russian football player. He plays for FC Rostov.

Club career
He made his debut in the Russian Premier League for FC Rostov on 19 June 2020 in a game against PFC Sochi. FC Rostov was forced to field their Under-18 squad in that game as their main squad was quarantined after 6 players tested positive for COVID-19.

On 9 July 2021, he joined FC Olimp-Dolgoprudny-2 on loan.

References

External links
 
 
 

2001 births
People from Rostov Oblast
Living people
Russian footballers
Russia youth international footballers
Association football midfielders
FC Rostov players
FC Olimp-Dolgoprudny players
Russian Premier League players
Russian Second League players
Sportspeople from Rostov Oblast